Fra' Ludwig Hoffmann von Rumerstein (21 January 1937 – 13 December 2022) was a Grand Commander of the Sovereign Military Order of Malta. He was acting head of the order for some months in 2017.

Early life
Hoffmann-Rumerstein was the son of Ernst Hoffmann von Rumerstein and of his wife, Baroness Pia Riccabona von Reichenfels.  He was baptised with the names Ludwig Franz Xaver Irenäus Joseph Peter Raimund Maria.

Hoffmann-Rumerstein studied law at the University of Innsbruck graduating in 1962. He then studied philosophy at the Pontifical Gregorian University. After he completed his military service, he practised as a lawyer in Innsbruck from 1970 to 2002.

Order of Malta
Hoffmann-Rumerstein’s work with the Sovereign Military Order of Malta began as a volunteer.  In 1968, he co-founded the Order’s Austrian volunteer corps in North Tyrol.  In 1970, he joined the Order as a Knight of Honour and Devotion. From 1971 to 1979 he led the Order’s group of volunteers in Innsbruck.  From 1979 to 1986 he was a member of the board of directors of the Malteser Hospitaldienst Austria (de).

In 1984, Hoffmann-Rumerstein took vows as a Knight of Justice.  That same year he was elected a member of the Order’s Sovereign Council.  He served as Grand Commander of the Order from 1994 to 2004.  He was re-elected Grand Commander in 2014.

From the end of January until the end of April 2017, Hoffmann-Rumerstein was the acting head of the Order, as Lieutenant ad interim, after the resignation of Fra' Matthew Festing as Prince and Grand Master. He retained this office until 29 April 2017, when the Complete Council of State elected Fra' Giacomo dalla Torre del Tempio di Sanguinetto as Lieutenant of the Grand Master for a period of one year.

Personal life and death
Hoffmann-Rumerstein died in Innsbruck, Tyrol on 13 December 2022, at the age of 85.

Honours
 1989: Grand Decoration of Honour in Silver with Sash of the Republic of Austria
 1990: Grand Officer of the Order of Merit of the Italian Republic
 1994: Grand Decoration of Honour in Gold with Sash of the Republic of Austria
 1994: Grand Cross of the Order of Merit of the Italian Republic
 1998: Order of the White Double Cross, 2nd Class, of the Republic of Slovakia
 1999: Order of the Lithuanian Grand Duke Gediminas
 2009: Grand Cross of the Order of Merit of the Republic of Hungary
 2000: Honorary Companion with Breast Star of the National Order of Merit (Malta)
 2004: Decoration of Honour of the State of Tyrol
 2016: Grand Cross of the Order of the Star of Romania
 Grand Cross of the Order of Pope Pius IX
 Grand Officer of the Legion of Honour

References

|-

 
|-

1937 births
2022 deaths
20th-century Austrian lawyers
Austrian Roman Catholics
Knights Grand Cross of the Order of Pope Pius IX
Knights Grand Cross of the Order of Merit of the Italian Republic
Grand Crosses of the Order of the Lithuanian Grand Duke Gediminas
Grand Officiers of the Légion d'honneur
Lieutenants of the Sovereign Military Order of Malta
Bailiffs of the Sovereign Military Order of Malta
Austrian nobility
People from Innsbruck
Pontifical Gregorian University alumni
University of Innsbruck alumni